Geçitboyu is a village in the central district of Şırnak Province in Turkey. The village is populated by Kurds of the Berwarî tribe and had a population of 1,557 in 2021.

The hamlet of Ilıca is attached to Geçitboyu.

References 

Kurdish settlements in Şırnak Province
Villages in Şırnak District